George C. Wallis (1871-1956) was a British printer, cinema manager and writer, best known for his forays into science-fiction literature. He has published many novels, such as Killing London and The Call of Peter Gaskell. He is also known for creating scientific romances, such as The Last Sacrifice.

Wallis was born on March 18, 1871, and raised in Weedon, Nottinghamshire.  He died in Sheffield, Yorkshire on September 1, 1956.

References 

1871 births
1956 deaths
British science fiction writers
British printers